Ian Clinging (born 12 June 1958) is a Scottish former professional footballer who played as a midfielder. Born in Motherwell, he played over 300 matches in the Scottish Football League for four clubs.

References

1958 births
Living people
Footballers from Motherwell
Scottish footballers
Association football midfielders
Motherwell F.C. players
Greenock Morton F.C. players
Forfar Athletic F.C. players
Berwick Rangers F.C. players
Scottish Football League players
Kilmarnock F.C. players
Carluke Rovers F.C. players